Bernard Yang may refer to:

Bernard Yeung (born 1953), Hong Kong-American economist
Bernard Yeoh (born 1969), Malaysian-British sport shooter